The BRP Conrado Yap (PS-39) is a  currently commissioned with the Philippine Navy. She is the service' first modern corvette and one of its most heavily armed units. She was originally named ROKS Chungju (PCC-762) during her service with the ROK Navy.

Design 
The ship has a displacement of 1,220 tons full load. It has a rated capacity for a crew consisting of 118 personnel and can operate non-stop for 20 days. The ship has a maximum speed of 30 knots and has a range of to 4,000 nautical miles. It is powered by a combined diesel or gas, and LM2500 gas turbines.

The ship was designed for coastal defense and anti-submarine operations. She is being utilized by the Philippine Navy for anti-submarine warfare (ASW) training in preparation for transition to the new frigates being built in South Korea for the Philippine Navy. The Department of National Defense is trying to request for transfer of more units.

Armament 
The ship's armament consists of:
 two (2) Oto Melara 76mm/62 caliber Compact naval guns,
 two (2) Otobreda 40mm L/70 twin naval guns,
 two (2) Mk. 32 triple torpedo tubes,
 two (2) Mk 9 depth charge racks, and
 six (6) M2HB Browning .50 caliber machine guns.

The vessel is also equipped with a mount for a Man-portable air-defense system that can accommodate either:
 MBDA Mistral SIMBAD-RC, or
 LIGNex1 Chiron VSHORAD missile system.

Service history 
In 1987, she was commissioned into the ROK Navy as the ROKS Chungju (PCC-762). She was decommissioned in December 2016, after decades of service.

On 5 August 2019, she was officially transferred to the Philippine Navy and was commissioned into service the same day at the Jinhae Naval Base. She was named BRP Conrado Yap (PS-39), after Philippine Army Capt. Conrado Yap who fought in the Korean War.

The ship is optimized for anti-submarine warfare missions. She will be used to build anti-submarine warfare (ASW) capabilities of the Philippine Navy, along with the newly acquired ASW helicopters. Prior to these, the Philippines lacked any ASW capability in a region where the number of submarines being operated by neighboring countries was reportedly set to grow.

On 17 February 2020, BRP Conrado Yap encountered the People's Liberation Army Navy Type 056A corvette Liupanshui on its patrol mission. Crews of the Conrado Yap visually observed Liupanshui'''s gun control director pointing at them.

On 26 November 2022, Conrado Yap'' conducted a Goodwill Exercise with JS Harusame in the vicinity of Subic.

See also
 List of ships of the Philippine Navy

References

1986 ships
Corvettes of the Philippine Navy
Pohang-class corvettes
Ships built by Hanjin Heavy Industries